The Turks in Bosnia and Herzegovina (Bosnian: Turci u Bosni i Hercegovini / Турци у Босни и Херцеговини) also known as Bosnian Turks, are ethnic Turks who form the oldest ethnic minority in Bosnia and Herzegovina. The Turkish community  began to settle in the region in the 15th century under Ottoman rule, however, many Turks immigrated to Turkey when Bosnia and Herzegovina came under Austro-Hungarian rule.

History
When the Ottoman Empire conquered the Bosnian kingdom in 1463, a significant Turkish community arrived in the region. The Turkish community grew steadily throughout the Ottoman rule of Bosnia; however, after the Ottomans were defeated in the Balkan Wars (1912–13), the majority of Turks, along with other Muslims living in the region, left their homes and migrated to Turkey as "Muhacirs" (Muslim refugees from non-Muslim countries).

Culture
In 2003 the Parliamentary Assembly of Bosnia and Herzegovina adopted the Law on the Protection of Rights of Members of National Minorities. According to the Law, the Turkish minority's cultural, religious, educational, social, economic, and political freedoms are protected by the State.

Language
The Turkish language is officially recognized as a minority language of Bosnia and Herzegovina in accordance with the European Charter for Regional or Minority Languages, under Article 2, paragraph 2, of the 2010 ratification.

According to the 2013 census, 1,233 people (817 males, 416 females), 990 of whom lived in the Sarajevo Canton, declared Turkish as their mother tongue whereas 1,108 (738 males, 370 females), 970 of whom lived in the Sarajevo Canton, declared themselves as ethnic Turks.

Religion
The Turkish minority practice the Sunni branch of Islam but tend to be highly secular.

Community
Turkish community in Bosnia is well provided, due to historical strong bond between both countries.

Demographics
According to the 1991 population census 267 Turks were living in Bosnia and Herzegovina, while the 2013 Bosnian census gave a number of 1,108, almost all in the Federation of Bosnia and Herzegovina (1,097 people). More than eighty percent of all Turks in Bosnia and Herzegovina live in the capital Sarajevo.

Noble families
Kadić family

Notable people

Alija Izetbegović, president of the presidency of Bosnia and Herzegovina (Turkish grandmother) 
children: 
Bakir Izetbegović, politician
Aldin Mustafić, a member of the Turkish minority in Bosnia and Herzegovina - wrote a book on the Bosnian language in Arabic script entitled "The Epochs of Arabic phonetic thoughts and Arebica", as part of the influence of Turkish culture in the region - i.e. in Bosnia and Herzegovina.
Şükrü Âli Ögel, Turkish Army officer, politician
, painter
, politician
Derviš Korkut, Bosnia and Herzegovina librarian, teacher, humanist and orientalist, he comes from a well-known family of ulema who emigrated from Turkey to Bosnia in the 16th century.

See also
Turkish minorities in the former Ottoman Empire
Turks in the Balkans
Turks in the Arab world
History of Bosnia and Herzegovina (1463–1878)
Ottoman Bosnian families
Islam in Bosnia and Herzegovina
Muhacir

References

Bosnia and Herzegovina
Bosnia and Herzegovina
Ethnic groups in Bosnia and Herzegovina
Bosnia and Herzegovina
Muslim communities in Europe